The MA-1 bomber jacket (also known as the MA-1 flight jacket) is an American military jacket which was developed in the 1950s. The MA-1 and its predecessor, the B-15 flight jacket, were originally developed and needed at that time because the characteristics of the new jet aircraft created new requirements for pilot performance, safety, and comfort.

History 
Prior to the invention of jet aircraft, fleece-lined leather jackets were issued to flight personnel. However, the new jets could fly at much higher altitudes and in much colder temperatures than propeller aircraft. If the heavy, bulky leather jackets became wet from rain (when the pilot walked to his aircraft) or from perspiration, the water would freeze at high altitudes, making the jackets cold and uncomfortable. Also, the new jets were more streamlined in design. Cockpits were cramped and filled with new equipment. Speedy, unimpeded ingress and egress from cockpits became even more critical for safety. Rather than bulky leather, a sleek, lightweight yet warm jacket was needed for the new jet technology.

To meet these needs, a new type of flight jacket was developed from the existing B-15 jacket, which was initially produced in cotton, but later produced in the same pattern but in high quality nylon. The B-15 had a wool collar with pile carried over from the earlier B-10 that was found to interfere with straps in practice. Nylon had been discovered prior to World War II and used during the war for items such as parachutes, but was not used in flight clothing until after the war.

The first MA-1 jackets were issued to United States Air Force and Navy pilots and flight crews. Small numbers were also issued to Army flight personnel. MA-1 jackets first appeared in Europe in very small quantities in the mid-to-late 1950s probably on the black market and at sales of government surplus. 

In 1963, Alpha Industries won the contract to manufacture the MA-1. More MA-1 jackets appeared in Europe as Alpha and later Rothco began to export MA-1 jackets and other military clothing to European Air Forces and commercial customers.

Characteristics 
The MA-1 was designed by the United States Air Force to serve as an intermediate weight flight jacket for use all year. This was accomplished by manufacturing the MA-1 from very high quality nylon fabrics and polyester interlinings. The lightweight nylon design allowed the pilot to wear the jacket open and be comfortable in warm weather. Upon entering the aircraft, the pilot could zip the jacket closed and be afforded ample protection against the cold conditions encountered in flight.

The MA-1 underwent design modifications during its long history of use but the classic highly functional design has remained basically the same. The original design was contained in United States government military specification "MIL-J-8279." Changes to the jacket were periodically made by the Air Force because of the introduction of new textiles, new sewing techniques or new aircraft cockpit design. The military specification was amended to reflect the changes which was signaled by adding a letter to the Mil. Spec. For example, MA-1 specifications progressed from Mil-J-8279 to J-8279A, then J-8279B, J-8279C, et cetera. The most important revision, Mil-J-8279F, was issued in November 1978. The final revision before being phased out by the United States military is "Mil-J-8279G" and "Mil-J-8279G AMENDMENT-1", introduced in March 1988 and October 1990 respectively. These two final revisions were designated for ground crew only as fire-resistant CWU-36/P and CWU-45/P were issued to aircrew.

The MA-1 was initially produced in midnight blue and sage green. Blue was the original color used by the military, but it was soon replaced by green. During the Korean War (1950–1953) mixing flight clothing from multiple time periods and colors was not unusual. Presumably, the green was eventually adopted because it blended more easily with the environment should the pilot need camouflage protection on the ground. During the Vietnam War, there were variant commercial copies of MA-1 in camouflage pattern which were purchased by American servicemen. Official versions with a safety orange interior were reversible: interior pockets had snaps and could function when flipped to the outside, the front zipper had a large fob allowing zipping from either side. Downed or lost airmen hoping for rescue could reverse the jacket and reveal the bright high-visibility anti-camouflage orange as a locating-aid for their searchers. While no longer issued by the United States military, the MA-1 remains popular among many United States-allied armed forces (e.g. Israel, Japan, South Korea, Philippines, Taiwan (ROC) and Thailand).

Civilian use 
MA-1 jackets have become fashionable worldwide, especially in the United States, Japan and the United Kingdom. Many American clothing manufacturers, formerly military contractors now produce a variety of colors in addition to the traditional.

Because the MA-1 Jacket not only keeps the wearer warm, but is highly comfortable, the jacket is very popular in Europe and Australia during winter. The jacket is also worn in North America, where it is commonly known as a bomber jacket, especially in areas with cold weather. These jackets became popular in the late 1970s with punks, mods and skinheads. During the 1980s the jackets had extensive exposure in style magazines such as The Face and i-D, often reimagined by clothes designers of the time.

The MA-1 is also in use in several police forces and security agencies where cold weather is a part of everyday life. They were chosen over several other designs primarily for the sturdy construction and the heavy insulation needed in cold temperatures.

See also 
 Blouson
 Letter jacket
 MA-2 bomber jacket
 Valley Apparel L.L.C., an earlier manufacturer

References 

 Cirker, Alan D. THE ALPHA STORY: 50 YEARS OF AN AMERICAN MILITARY CLOTHING COMPANY. Baker Hill Publishing, 2009. 131pp.
 Imai, Kesaharu. SUIT UP!: THE FLIGHT JACKET. World Photo Press (Japan), 1993. 367pp.
 Imai, Kesaharu. FLIGHT JACKET ALL CATALOG. World Photo Press (Japan), 1994. 223pp.
 Maguire, Jon & Conway, John. AMERICAN FLIGHT JACKETS. Schiffer, 1994. 277pp.
 Nelson, Derek & Parsons, Dave. HELL-BENT FOR LEATHER: THE SAGA OF THE A-2 AND G-1 FLIGHT JACKETS. Motorbooks, 1990. 160pp.
 Thompson, Leroy. UNIFORMS OF THE INDO-CHINA AND VIETNAM WARS. Blandford Press, 1984. 160pp.

1950s fashion
Jackets
United States military uniforms
Aircrew clothing
United States Air Force uniforms
skinhead
 punk fashion
Military equipment introduced in the 1950s